Williamswood is a community of the Halifax Regional Municipality in the Canadian province of Nova Scotia on the Chebucto Peninsula . The community is currently represented by Liberal MLA, Brendan Maguire.

References
 Explore HRM

Communities in Halifax, Nova Scotia
General Service Areas in Nova Scotia